Øyane or Veum is a village in Fyresdal Municipality in Vestfold og Telemark county, Norway. Veum Church is located in the village. The village is located along Norwegian County Road 355.

References

Fyresdal
Villages in Vestfold og Telemark